The Sony Xperia X Compact is an Android smartphone manufactured and marketed by Sony. Part of the Xperia X series, the phone was announced to the public along with the Xperia XZ at a press conferences which was held at IFA 2016 on September 1, 2016. In Japan, the phones model number is SO-02J, which is exclusive to NTT Docomo, and is available in a water and dust resistant variant unlike the global version.

Specifications

Hardware
The Sony Xperia X Compact has a 4.6-inch LTPS IPS LCD display, Hexa-core (4x1.4 GHz Cortex-A53 & 2x1.8 GHz Cortex-A72) Qualcomm Snapdragon 650 processor, 3 GB of RAM and 32 GB of internal storage that can be expanded using microSD cards up to 256 GB. The phone has a 2700 mAh Li-Ion battery, 23 MP rear camera with LED flash and 5 MP front-facing camera with auto-focus. It is available in White, Universe black, Mist blue colors.

Software
Sony Xperia X Compact ships with Android 6.0.1 Marshmallow and is upgradable to Android 8.0 Oreo. In accordance with Sony's stated practices, the phone received system and security updates through September, 2018 (two years from release).

Reception
Compared to previous models in the Compact subseries, the Xperia X Compact met with a mixed critical reception. Spec-wise it was not as powerful as the flagship Xperia XZ, which some people felt was a downgrade for a compact variant. Its build quality was also criticized, as well as the lack of waterproof that was present on its predecessor Sony Xperia Z5 Compact.

References

External links

Official White Paper

Android (operating system) devices
Sony smartphones
Mobile phones introduced in 2016